KRVM (1280 AM) is an NPR-member radio station broadcasting a news and information format. Licensed to Eugene, Oregon, United States, the station is currently owned by and licensed to Eugene School District 4J, and is affiliated with Jefferson Public Radio.

In the late 1990s, KRVM was known as KDUK (after the University of Oregon's duck mascot) and was an affiliate of Radio AAHS.

External links
Jefferson Public Radio
FCC History Cards for KRVM

RVM
NPR member stations
1947 establishments in Oregon
Radio stations established in 1947